CHAR-FM is a radio station that broadcasts on 92.7 FM in Rankin Inlet, Nunavut, Canada. The station is owned by James Sandy and Todd McKay.

The callsign CHAR-FM was used by a former radio station in Alert, Nunavut that operated on 105.9 FM, which was cancelled in 2007. It's uncertain when the current CHAR-FM began broadcasting in Rankin Inlet at 92.7 FM.

References

External links

Har
Year of establishment missing